Cristiano Godano (1966 Fossano, Cuneo, Italy) is an Italian musician and author, known mostly as the frontman of the Italian band Marlene Kuntz. He obtained an MSc in Economics.

He played as a guest with the Afterhours at the 2009 San Remo Festival. He has been appointed as artistic director of the Upload 2010 musical festival in Bolzano.

Non-musical activities
On January 16, 2008, he published his first book, the anthology of short novels I vivi ("The Living"), for Rizzoli. He also starred in "Tutta colpa di Giuda" an Italian movie shot by Davide Ferrario, of which he authored the soundtrack too.

References

Italian singer-songwriters
Italian male singers
Italian male writers
Living people
1966 births